Vivekananda Kendra Vidyalaya or VKV is the academic wing of Vivekananda Kendra (an organization based on Swami Vivekananda's preachings of life–reforming principles), operating a chain of schools under the project Vivekananda Kendra Siksha Prasar Vibhag (VKSPV). Vidyalaya is a sanskrit word meaning school. The corporate headquarters of the organization is at Kanyakumari, Tamil Nadu in southern India. The ideology of Gyan – Yagna, meaning Knowledge Worship, started by Ekanathji Ranade led to the inception of VKV.  The school teachings are inspired by the Vivekananda's philosophy of Man – Making & Nation Building.

Schools
There are a total of 64 VKVs providing education to approximately 20,000 students in the Indian states of Arunachal Pradesh, Assam, Karnataka, Nagaland and Tamil Nadu, besides the Andaman Islands. The schools are guided by their corporate values inspired by the general philosophies of Swami Vivekananda, such as Education is the manifestation of perfection already in man, If the poor boy can't come to education, education must go to him etc. The first VKV was started at Sher in Arunachal Pradesh. Most of these schools are fully residential and focus on the holistic growth of their students.

In Arunachal Pradesh
The schools in Arunachal Pradesh are run and managed under Vivekananda Kendra Arunachal Pradesh Trust (VKAPT) of Vivekananda Kendra headquartered at Dibrugarh in Assam.

In Assam
The schools in Assam are run and managed under Vivekananda Kendra Shiksha Prasar Vibhag (VKSPV) of Vivekananda Kendra headquartered at Guwahati in Assam.

17.
VKPV Jengraimukh
Majuli
2012
Primary

18.
VKV Borojalenga
Cachar
2014
Secondary

19. VKV Sadiya
Tinsukia
2014
Secondary

20.
VKV Tumpreng
West Karbi Anglong
2015
Secondary

21.
VKV Sissiborgaon
Dhemaji
2016
Primary

22. VKV Bokakhat
Golaghat
2018
Primary

23.
VKV Khatkhati ( Khatkhati, Bokajan, Karbi Anglong) 
2018
Primary

24.
VKV Mangaldai
Darrang
2018
Secondary

In Nagaland
The schools in Nagaland are run and managed under Vivekananda Kendra Shiksha Prasar Vibhag (VKSPV) of Vivekananda Kendra headquartered at Guwahati in Assam.

In Andaman
Ten schools are run in Andaman of which VKV, PortBlair situated in the capital of Andaman and Nicobar Islands is one among the oldest schools in the islands.

Schools in Tamil Nadu
Swami Vivekananda
Schools in Assam
Schools in Nagaland
Education in the Andaman and Nicobar Islands
Schools in Arunachal Pradesh
Vivekananda Kendra schools
Educational institutions in India with year of establishment missing